Tyler James "TJ" Sanders (born 14 December 1991) is a Canadian male volleyball player. He is a member of the Canada men's national volleyball team, a participant in the 2016 Summer Olympics, a gold medallist at the 2015 NORCECA Championship, and a bronze medalist at the 2015 Pan American Games. Bronze medalist at the 2017 World League where he ranked statistically as the top setter. He won the Polish cup with Trefl Gdansk. He has been sidelined by a back injury, but has helped the Canadian team qualify for the 2020 Tokyo Olympics.

Personal life
TJ Sanders was born in Winnipeg, Manitoba to Greg and Cindy Sanders. He began playing volleyball at the age of 12 after watching his older sister Sam play club volleyball. Growing up, he played club volleyball for the Forest City Volleyball Club in London, Ontario. TJ Sanders’ Olympic dream began in 2007 when Volleyball Canada was the host of an FIVB World League event in his hometown.

Playing career

Club
TJ was a member of the Full Time Training Center roster for the 2012/2013 season. He signed his first professional contract with Abiant Lycurgus in October 2013, making his debut for the club in a 3-1 win over Driasma Dynamo. After a successful first season with the club, in which they finished third in the league, TJ signed with the Swiss club PV Lugano. He spent the 2014/2015 season with the club, finishing the season as Swiss champions. TJ signed with MKS Będzin in the PlusLiga for the 2015/16 season. They finished last in the league, and did not make the playoffs.

For the 2016/17 season, TJ Sanders signed with the Turkish club Arkas Spor.

National Team
TJ Sanders was a member of the Canada men's junior national volleyball team from 2010 to 2011. He helped the team finish second at the 2010 Junior NORCECA Championship, and finish 11th at the 2011 U21 World Championship. As well, TJ helped them place 5th at the 2013 Universiade.

TJ joined the senior men's national team program in 2013 as a member of the men's "B" national team, and in 2014 joined the senior men's roster. He was a member of the squad that finished 7th at the 2014 FIVB Volleyball Men's World Championship, a national team best. In 2015, TJ helped the team win bronze at the Pan American Games, and gold at the 2015 Men's NORCECA Volleyball Championship.

TJ was a member of the squad that finished 5th at the 2016 Summer Olympics. In June 2021, Sanders was named to Canada's 2020 Olympic team.

Sporting Achievements
 National championships
 2013/2014  Dutch Championship, with Abiant Lycurgus
 2014/2015  Swiss Championship, with PV Lugano
 2016/2017  Turkish Championship, with Arkas Spor
 2017/2018  Polish Championship, with Trefl Gdańsk
 2017/2018  Polish Cup, with Trefl Gdańsk
 National team
 2010  Junior NORCECA Championship
 2011  U-21 Pan American Cup
 2015  NORCECA Championship
 2015  Pan American Games
 2017  FIVB World League
 Others
 2022  2022 Puvirnituq Volleyball Championship - Winter Classic

References

External links
 
 
 Profile at FIVB.org
 PlusLiga player profile

1991 births
Living people
Canadian men's volleyball players
Volleyball players from Winnipeg
Volleyball players at the 2015 Pan American Games
Pan American Games bronze medalists for Canada
Volleyball players at the 2016 Summer Olympics
Pan American Games medalists in volleyball
Olympic volleyball players of Canada
Medalists at the 2015 Pan American Games
Volleyball players at the 2020 Summer Olympics
Setters (volleyball)